Qaleh-ye Sorkh (also Romanized as Qal‘eh-ye Sorkh and Qal‘eh Sorkh; also known as Qal‘a Surkhi, Qal‘eh Shorkh, Qal‘eh Sorkhī, and Qal‘eh Surkhi) is a village in Jolgeh-ye Musaabad Rural District, in the Central District of Torbat-e Jam County, Razavi Khorasan Province, Iran. At the 2006 census, its population was 70, in 15 families.

References 

Populated places in Torbat-e Jam County